KNPA can refer to:
 National Police Agency (South Korea), the domestic police force of South Korea
 Naval Air Station Pensacola, a United States Navy base located near Warrington, Florida